Etielloides is a genus of snout moths. It was described by Shibuya in 1928.

Species
 Etielloides bipartitellus (Leech, 1889)
 Etielloides curvella Shibuya, 1928
 Etielloides kogii Yamanaka, 1998
 Etielloides longipalpus Ren & Li, 2006
 Etielloides sejunctella (Christoph, 1881)

References

Phycitinae
Pyralidae genera